This is a list of the heads of state of Belize, from the independence of Belize in 1981 to the present day.

From 1981 the head of state under the Constitution of Belize is the Monarch of Belize, currently King Charles III, who is also the monarch of the other Commonwealth realms. The King is represented in Belize by a governor-general.

Monarch (1981–present)
The succession to the throne is the same as the succession to the British throne.

Governor-General
The Governor-General is the representative of the Monarch in Belize and exercises most of the powers of the Monarch. The Governor-General is appointed for an indefinite term, serving at the pleasure of the Monarch. After the passage of the Statute of Westminster 1931, the Governor-General is appointed solely on the advice of the Cabinet of Belize without the involvement of the British government. In the event of a vacancy the Chief Justice served as Officer Administering the Government.

Status

Standards

References

External links
 World Statesmen – Belize
 Rulers.org – Belize

Government of Belize
Belize